Odontiinae is a subfamily of moths of the family Crambidae. The subfamily was described by Achille Guenée in 1854.

Tribes
 Hercynini
Aeglotis 
Autocharis 
Balaenifrons 
Blepharucha 
Boeotarcha  (= Botys crassicornis )
Canalibotys 
Canuza  (= Erotomanes )
Clupeosoma 
Cuneifrons 
Dausara 
Deanolis 
Dilacinia  (= Dilacina )
Ertrica 
Euctenospila 
Glaucodontia 
Gononoorda 
Hemiscopis 
Heortia  (= Eteta , Tyspana )
Hydrorybina 
Irigilla 
Kerbela 
Mabilleodes 
Neocymbopteryx 
Neogenesis 
Noctuelita 
Noordodes 
Phlyctaenomorpha 
Pitama 
Platynoorda 
Porphyronoorda 
Probalaenifrons 
Protrigonia 
Suinoorda 
Syntonarcha 
Taurometopa 
Thesaurica 
Tulaya  (= Hercynella )
Turania 
Usgentia 
 Eurrhypini
Argyrarcha 
Cliniodes  (= Basonga , Exarcha , Idessa , Metrea )
Dicepolia  (= Endolophia )
Eurrhypis  (= Threnodes )
Hyalinarcha 
Jativa 
Mecynarcha 
Mimoschinia 
Porphyrorhegma 
Pseudonoorda 
Pseudoschinia 
Sobanga 
Trigonoorda 
Viettessa 
 Odontiini
Aeschremon 
Anatralata 
Aporodes 
Atralata  (= Ennychia )
Cataonia 
Chlorobaptella  (= Chlorobapta )
Chrismania 
Cymbopteryx 
Cynaeda  (= Cynoeda , Noctuelia , Noctuaelia , Odontia )
Dentifovea 
Dichozoma 
Edia 
Epascestria  (= Epacestria , Phlyctaenodes , Phlyctoenodes )
Ephelis  (= Emprepes , Hammocallos )
Epimetasia  (= Metasiodes , Thyridopsis )
Eremanthe 
Frechinia 
Gyros  (= Monocona , Oribates )
Heliothelopsis 
Metaxmeste  (= Hercyna , Heryna , Metaxmestes )
Microtheoris 
Mojavia 
Mojaviodes 
Nannobotys 
Noctueliopsis 
Odontivalvia 
Plumipalpiella  (= Plumipalpia )
Pogonogenys 
Procymbopteryx 
Psammobotys 
Rhodocantha 
Tegostoma  (= Anthophilodes , Anthophilopsis )
Titanio  (= Noctuomorpha , Titania )

Former genera
Denticornutia 
Pelaea

References

 BioLib
 Fauna Europaea

 
Crambidae